I Don't Remember Ever Growing Up is the forty-third and final studio album by American pop singer Andy Williams, released in the UK by the Demon Music Group in 2007. In the liner notes of the album Williams writes, "Over the past few years I have come across songs that I really wanted to record. I picked 13 of my favorites and set out to make a new record." While the title track is the only new song, the other 12 selections were chart hits for other artists or, as is the case with "Desperado" by the Eagles, received critical acclaim without having been released as a single.

Track listing 

 "She's the One" (Karl Wallinger) – 3:52
 "Have You Ever Really Loved a Woman?" (from Don Juan DeMarco) (Bryan Adams, Michael Kamen, Robert John "Mutt" Lange) – 3:37
 "Every Breath You Take" (Sting) – 3:43
 "Have I Told You Lately" (from One Fine Day) (Van Morrison) – 4:18
"I Don't Want to Talk About It" (Danny Whitten)  – 3:43
"I'll Never Break Your Heart" (from Beauty and the Beast: The Enchanted Christmas) (Albert Manno, Don Black, Eugene Wilde, Rachel Portman) – 3:49
 "Desperado" (Glenn Frey, Don Henley) – 3:31
 "One Sweet Day" (Walter Afanasieff, Mariah Carey, Michael McCary, Nathan Morris, Wanya Morris, Shawn Stockman) – 4:10
 "Breaking Up Is Hard to Do" (Howard Greenfield, Neil Sedaka) – 4:44
 "The Shadow of Your Smile" (from The Sandpiper) (Johnny Mandel, Paul Francis Webster) – 3:31
 "Just to See Her" (Jimmy George, Lou Pardini) – 3:44
 "Lady in Red" (from Working Girl) (Chris de Burgh) – 4:02
 "I Don't Remember Ever Growing Up" (Artie Butler) – 4:41

Song information

Neil Sedaka's first recording of "Breaking Up Is Hard to Do" reached number one on Billboard magazine's Hot 100 in 1962, but on this album Williams pays tribute to Sedaka's much slower 1975 version that went to number one on the magazine's Adult Contemporary chart and got as high as number eight pop. "The Shadow of Your Smile" is the title track from Williams's spring of 1966 release, and "Desperado" comes from the 1973 album of the same name by the Eagles. Rod Stewart's first recording of "I Don't Want to Talk About It" was released in 1975 and peaked at number 46 on the pop chart, but his 1990 remake, while not a Hot 100 hit, did reach the Adult Contemporary chart, where it made it to number two.

The Police spent eight weeks at number one on the Hot 100 with "Every Breath You Take" in 1983. "Lady in Red" by Chris de Burgh reached number two Adult Contemporary and number three pop in 1987, the same year in which Smokey Robinson got to number eight pop, number two R&B, and number one Adult Contemporary with "Just to See Her". Van Morrison took "Have I Told You Lately" to number 12 Adult Contemporary in 1989, and Rod Stewart spent five weeks at number one with the song on that same chart in addition to peaking at number five pop in 1993.

"Have You Ever Really Loved a Woman?" by Bryan Adams enjoyed five weeks at number one on Billboard magazine's Hot 100 and Adult Contemporary charts in 1995. "One Sweet Day" by Mariah Carey and Boyz II Men was released later that year and lasted 16 weeks at number one on the pop chart, 13 weeks at number one Adult Contemporary, and nine weeks at number two R&B. "I'll Never Break Your Heart" by the Backstreet Boys spent seven weeks at number one on the Adult Contemporary chart and reached number four on Billboard's Hot 100 Airplay list in 1998, and Robbie Williams's recording of "She's the One" was at number one for a week in the UK in 1999.

Personnel
From the liner notes:

 Production
Artie Butler - arranger (except as noted), supervisor
Bruce Botnick - engineering, mixing, mastering
Peter Fuchs - string engineer
Joe Galante - arranger ("Just to See Her")
Nick Hazard - arranger ("The Shadow of Your Smile")
Chad Heasley - lead vocal engineer
Ken Thorne - arranger ("Have You Ever Really Loved a Woman?", "Every Breath You Take", "One Sweet Day")
Andy Williams - producer
Dick Williams - background vocal arranger

 Performers
Chris Botti - trumpet ("The Shadow of Your Smile")
Bratislava Symphony - strings
John Cox - piano, keyboard
Tom Dostal - percussion
John Goux - guitar
Tim May - guitar
John Robinson - drums
Leland Sklar - bass
Mike Valerio - bass
Andy Williams - lead vocal
Rhythm section and horns recorded at Capitol Studio B in Hollywood, Los Angeles, California
Strings recorded by the Bratislava Symphony in Bratislava, Slovakia
Andy Williams's vocals recorded at the Moon River Theatre, Branson, Missouri

References

Bibliography

Andy Williams albums
Covers albums
Albums recorded at Capitol Studios
2007 albums